Athyras was a Greek city in ancient Thrace, located in the region of the Propontis. 

Its site has been located near the modern Turkish city of Büyükçekmece.

Under the name Athyra, it is a titular see of both the Eastern Orthodox Church and Roman Catholic Church.

See also
Greek colonies in Thrace

References

Greek colonies in Thrace
Populated places in ancient Thrace
Former populated places in Turkey
Members of the Delian League
Catholic titular sees in Europe